V. A. Andamuthu was elected to the Tamil Nadu Legislative Assembly from the Bhavanisagar constituency in the 1996 elections. He was a candidate of the Dravida Munnetra Kazhagam (DMK) party.

In April 1997, together with fellow DMK politicians P. Selvaraj and S. K. Rajendran, Andamuthu irked Karunanidhi, the Chief Minister, by praying for the continuation of the DMK government. They did so by walking on burning coals at the Pannari Amman temple, near Salem. The atheist Karunanidhi said "I am not bothered how long my government lasts. I am worried about how long it will adhere to the principles of rationalism." He threatened to expel from the party any person who emulated the act.

References 

Tamil Nadu MLAs 1996–2001
Dravida Munnetra Kazhagam politicians
Year of birth missing
Possibly living people